Revenue Analytics is a revenue management and price optimization software company based in Atlanta, Georgia, United States. The company was founded by two brothers and their father. Dax Cross is the chief executive officer, and Zach Cross is the president of Revenue Analytics. Robert G. Cross is the chairman.

References

Companies based in Atlanta